Salling is a Danish retail chain that operates two department stores located in the Danish cities of Aarhus and Aalborg. The company used to be known as F. Salling Stormagasin A/S.

As of January 2022, the company was owned by the Salling Group (before 2018, known as Dansk Supermarked) which was in turn 81% owned by F. Salling Invest A/S and F. Salling Holding A/S (known as the Salling Companies) and 19% owned by A.P. Moller-Maersk Group.

See also
Føtex
Bilka
Netto
Dansk Supermarked A/S

External links

Sallings website
History of Salling in Danish
Dansk Supermarked official website

Retail companies established in 1906
Retail companies of Denmark
Companies based in Aarhus
Dansk Supermarked

Danish companies established in 1906
Salling Group